Calgary Roman Catholic Separate School District No. 1 or the Calgary Catholic School District (CSSD) is the Roman Catholic separate school board in Calgary, Alberta, Canada.  It also serves the neighbouring communities of Airdrie, Chestermere, Cochrane and Rocky View County. The CSSD receives funding for students from the provincial government of Alberta.

History
The district was founded on 18 December 1885 as the Lacombe Roman Catholic School District No. 1 in what was then part of the North West Territories.  Its first school, also built in 1885, was St. Mary's, which is the oldest operating school in Calgary (though in a newer building).

Size
The CSSD is second in size (by student count) to the city's main school board, the public Calgary Board of Education (CBE).  Unlike the Calgary Board of Education, the territory of the CSSD extends slightly outside the municipal limits of the city.

For the 2020 - 2021 school year, there were over 59,000 students in the CSSD, with 118 schools in total.

Governance
A group of seven elected trustees run the CSSD. Trustees represent wards in the city, as well as neighboring communities. They are elected every three years, in the regular municipal election.  In the election, Calgary voters can only vote for a trustee to one (not both) of the two school boards. Voters for the CSSD will include Catholics and non-Catholics who support the Catholic system. The public (CBE) and Catholic (CSSD) systems operate independently of each other, and are both under the direct authority of the provincial government of Alberta. The last election was in October 2017.

Special Programs

The CSSD offers a variety of specialized programs, including Advanced Placement, Fine Arts, the Hockey Canada Skills Academy, Home Study, International Baccalaureate, Languages, Single Gender and Year-Round Education. There is also the Self-Directed Learning program at Bishop Carroll High School, which allows students to move through the Alberta curriculum at their own individual pace.

Elementary and Junior High Schools 
In Alberta, an elementary school normally teaches Kindergarten to Grade 6, while a junior high school teaches Grades 7–9. Some junior high schools are combined with high schools or elementary schools. Some schools may have French Immersion in Grade 7, 8 or 9. The following list provides information on CSSD elementary and junior high schools.

Senior high schools
In Alberta, a senior high school teaches Grades 10-12 (what other jurisdictions call "secondary schools"). However, some may not teach all three grades.  Also, some may also teach earlier grades. The following is a list of CSSD senior high schools.

See also
List of Alberta school boards

Notes

References

External links

School districts in Alberta
Roman Catholic schools in Alberta
Education in Calgary